The Pure Land is a novel written by David Foster. The novel was published in 1974, and was Foster's first. It was the winner of the first The Age Book of the Year award.

It is divided into four parts. Part One is set in 1930s Katoomba, New South Wales where the middle-aged landscape photographer Albert Manwaring travels to America with his daughter. Part Two, during the 1960s, focuses on Manwaring's daughter, Jean (or Janet) living in America and discusses originality of art, especially Australian, European and American art. In Part Three, in 1970, Janet's son, Danny, becomes a scientist and intellectual, Albert Manwaring's antithesis. In Part Four Danny intends to move to Australia, where his family is originally from, and ends up in Katoomba.

References
Shaw, Narelle. "The Pure Land". The Literary Encyclopedia. 27 July 2004. Accessed 5 July 2008.
The Journal of Commonwealth Literature, Vol. 26, No. 2, 13-43 (1991)
Lever, Susan. (2 Feb 2006) "Ratbag Writers and Cranky Critics: In Their Praise" Journal of the Association for the Study of Australian Literature Online. Accessed 5 July 2008.

1974 Australian novels
Novels set in New South Wales
1974 debut novels
Katoomba, New South Wales
Macmillan Publishers books